SuperTennis is an Italian terrestrial and satellite television channel broadcasting tennis live of the Italian Tennis Federation.

Among the various events broadcasts the Davis Cup, the Fed Cup, the ATP Tour Masters 1000, ATP Tour 500, ATP Tour 250 events and the WTA Tour.

See also
 Television in Italy
 Digital terrestrial television in Italy
 Sky Italia

External links
 Official website of SuperTennis 

Television channels in Italy
Sports television networks
Sports television in Italy
Italian-language television stations
Television channels and stations established in 2008
2008 establishments in Italy